Get Your Own Back was a British children's television game show created by Brian Marshall. Each episode staged a contest between teams of children – attempting to score as many points as possible – and their respective adults – attempting to make tasks as difficult as possible for their child contestants – playing a variety of games. The winning child earns a right to get revenge on the adult by ejecting them into a tank of gunge; adult contestants in the show are somewhat embarrassing, for a variety of reasons, to their child counterparts.

Airing on BBC One's children's television block, it ran from 26 September 1991 to 1 January 2004, and was hosted by Dave Benson Phillips. Lisa Brockwell also presented the final three series of the show alongside Phillips, and Peter Simon served the role of voice over in 1995.

Format
The show consisted of two teams (the first series had three), each comprising one child contestant and a parent/relative/older sibling/teacher/celebrity (aged 16 to around 70) who in the child's eyes had committed some sort of crime that they wanted to seek revenge for. These 'crimes' were usually trivial, such as singing badly or asking the child to tidy their room. Dave and the audience always showed bias against the adults by booing them as much as possible.

Main Game
Throughout the show, the teams must compete in several games, with the adults trying to hinder their child to score while wearing inflatable or otherwise comical costumes. A list of games include:
Poke 'em Out - Both team members stand on a stool, the child wearing a knight armor with a spear and the adult a dragon costume covered in balloons. The object of the game is for the child to pop as many balloons as possible with the spear, with the one on the tail being worth more than the ones on the body.
Royal Flush - On an inflatable castle, the parents are on top, sitting on thrones and having gunge ready. On the signal, the childs must bring six nuggets down into a tub. Managing to collect all six nuggets within the alloted time will result in the adult being gunged, in addition to their throne deflating.

Final Round: The Gunk Dunk
Throughout every series the final round was called the "Gunk Dunk", where the losing adult was always thrown into a pool of colourful, messy gunge. A later series introduced a 'forfeit' whereby the losing child had to place their favourite toy in an incinerator; although the toy was not actually destroyed, the concept was later dropped.

Series 1
Both the parent and the child sit above a pool of gunge. The parent has to answer five question correctly within 45 seconds, but they are not allowed to give answers beginning with a specific letter. Failing to do this will result in them getting dropped into the pool, but if they do succeed, their child will get dropped in instead.

Transmissions

References

External links

Get Your Own Back at BFI

1991 British television series debuts
2004 British television series endings
1990s British children's television series
2000s British children's television series
BBC children's television shows
British children's game shows
1990s British game shows
2000s British game shows
English-language television shows
Television series about children
Television series featuring gunge